Latiume Junior Fosita (born 25 July 1992) is a Tonga rugby union player who currently plays as a utility back for  in the Mitre 10 Cup and the Tonga national rugby union team.

Career

Fosita started his career with a surprise move from Auckland to South Africa where he turned out for Wits University in the 2013 Varsity Cup tournament.   However, the move west didn't work out as planned and he played only 2 games before heading back to New Zealand.   He linked up with Northland ahead of the 2013 ITM Cup, the move had teething problems for both parties as the Taniwha endured a disappointing campaign and Fosita only made 1 appearance.   2014 was more fruitful with Fosita making 10 appearances and Northland showing a much improved performance.

International career

Fosita made his international debut for Tonga on 9 November 2013 in a match against  in Bucharest and has since established himself as a regular member of the side.

While he was initially not selected for the 2019 Rugby World Cup squad, he was selected as a replacement for Kurt Morath.

References

1992 births
Living people
Tongan rugby union players
Tonga international rugby union players
Rugby union fly-halves
Rugby union fullbacks
Rugby union wings
Northland rugby union players
People from Haʻapai
Auckland rugby union players